The 2018 Liberian Cup is the 2018 edition of the Liberian FA Cup, the knockout football competition of Liberia.

Quarterfinals
[Sep 29]

NPA Anchors               0-0 FC BEA Mountain           [aet, 3-1 pen]

LISCR                     2-1 Watanga                   

Barrack Young Controllers 3-0 Paynesville FC            

[Sep 30]

MC Breweries              2-0 Nimba Kwadoe

Semifinals
[Oct 5]

Barrack Young Controllers 4-2 NPA Anchors               [aet]

LISCR                     2-0 MC Breweries

Final
[Oct 19, The Antoinette Tubman Stadium, Monrovia]

Barrack Young Controllers 4-0 LISCR

See also
2018 Liberian First Division League

References

Liberia
Cup
Football competitions in Liberia